Rawang Bypass, Federal Route 37 also known as Rawang–Serendah Highway, is a federally-funded divided highway bypass  in Rawang, Selangor, Malaysia. The 10-km highway was opened to traffic on 28 November 2017 at 9.00 pm. Construction of the RM628mil Rawang Bypass began on 16 July 2005 and was completed on 21 November 2017. It features a 2.7-km elevated viaduct with its highest pillar of 58.2 meters.

The Rawang Bypass FT37 was built to solve the traffic congestion along the Malaysia Federal Route 1 in the town centre of Rawang. It was reported that the travelling time from Serendah to Selayang via the Kuala Lumpur–Ipoh Road FT1 may take up to 2 hours due to severe congestion in Rawang town centre. The Rawang Bypass FT37 helps to reduce the travelling time to only 30 minutes.

Background

The Rawang Bypass FT37 is a 9-km divided highway that runs from Templer Park to Serendah. It continues from Kuala Lumpur–Rawang Highway FT1, where the FT1 highway is diverted to Rawang, before ascending uphill via a 2.7-km viaduct with the gradient of 5.8%. The Rawang Bypass viaduct has its highest pillar at the height of 58.2 m, making it the second highest roadway viaduct in Malaysia. The remaining 6.3-km section is built at ground level. The Rawang Bypass FT37 ends at Kuala Lumpur—Ipoh Road FT1 near Serendah via a trumpet interchange.

Along the FT37 highway, only two interchanges exist, with about three stub LILO intersections and a fast lane-to-fast lane U-turn near its northern terminus for southbound traffic.

History

The Rawang Bypass FT37 project is a revival of the Kuala Lumpur Arah Serendah Expressway (KLAS), also known as the Kuala Lumpur–Rawang Expressway, which was scrapped due to the effect of the 1997 Asian financial crisis. The project was initially supposed to be constructed as a controlled-access expressway that would run along the Federal Route 1 corridor, with LeKLAS Sdn. Bhd. being appointed as its concessionaire and constructor.

The project was revived by the federal government in 2005 as the Rawang Bypass project due to severe traffic congestion in Rawang. However, the Rawang Bypass project was constructed not as a controlled-access toll expressway but rather as a limited-access divided highway. The contract of the RM628 million highway construction job was awarded to Syarikat Panzana Enterprise Sdn. Bhd. Construction of the Rawang Bypass FT37 commenced on 16 July 2005.

Construction of the Rawang Bypass project was divided into two stages. The first stage was to upgrade the existing the 12.5-km two-lane Kuala Lumpur–Ipoh Road FT1 from Bandar Baru Selayang to Templer Park into a divided highway known as the Kuala Lumpur–Rawang Highway FT1, completed in 2007. The second stage was to build a completely new bypass route that diverts the through traffic away from the town centre of Rawang.

Environmental issue
The construction of the second stage took a longer time due to environmental concern towards the project. Initially, the planned route was longer, would be built completely on ground level and might run through the Selangor State Heritage Park and Templer Park. Due to protests from environmentalists and pressure from local residents who insisted on going ahead with the project despite possible environmental issues, the route was realigned and redesigned, and a 2.7-km viaduct was constructed along the border of the Selangor State Heritage Park to minimize the negative impact towards the critically endangered Giam Kanching trees which is an endemic species and can only be found nowhere else but in the heritage park. Through the viaduct construction approach, the affected forest area was reduced from 65 hectares to only 24 hectares. The Rawang Bypass FT37 was completed on 21 November 2017, after 12 years of construction.

Due to the very long construction period, a hoax claiming the opening ceremony of the Rawang Bypass FT37 to be held on 15 November 2017 went viral through social media on 13 November 2017, which was denied by the Malaysian Public Works Department. Instead, the actual opening ceremony was held on 28 November 2017.

List of interchanges

References

See also
 Malaysia Federal Route 1
 Kuala Lumpur–Rawang Highway - another component of the Rawang Bypass project
 Interstate 70 (Glenwood Canyon) - another highway project with similar environmental approach

Malaysian Federal Roads
Highways in Malaysia
Expressways and highways in the Klang Valley
Cancelled expressway projects in Malaysia